Børselv is a village in Porsanger Municipality in Troms og Finnmark county, Norway. It is located at the base of the Sværholt Peninsula, along the east side of the Porsangerfjorden, at the outlet of the river Børselva.

Børselv Church is located in this village.  The area is full of Kven language-speakers and the Kvæntunet cultural and language centre for the Kven people is located in Børselv.

References

Villages in Finnmark
Porsanger
Populated places of Arctic Norway
Ethnic enclaves in Norway